The Entente: Battlefields WW1 (also known as World War I: The Great War) is a real-time strategy video game developed by Lesta Studio and published in 2003 by Buka Entertainment. A Western version was released by Encore, Inc. in 2004. It simulates World War I from the perspective of the five main combatants: Russia, France, Germany, Britain and the Austrian-Hungarian Empire. It is similar in many ways to other real-time strategy games, focusing on economy and military paths to victory.

Gameplay
The single player battles in The Entente are the standard battles of the game. The first option for single player games are the missions. They are battles of the Great War that don’t fit any of the campaigns, particularly on the Eastern Front.

The second option is the combatants’ own campaigns. These represent some of the main battles that the countries fought that were linked in some way. The final option is random maps. Similar to the Cossacks series random and death matches, these games start with the player having a single building and several workers. The victory condition for these games is to destroy the enemy completely.

The Entente: Battlefields World War I sports an array of different units from all aspects of the First World War and can be broken up into several different types-infantry, artillery, vehicles (including tanks and transport vehicles), ships, and planes.

Infantry are ranks of foot soldiers often supported by several officers (or workers), although specialist infantry such as machine gunners, flame throwers, elite foot soldiers, mortar teams, and mounted infantry can also be used. Artillery allows the player to wipe out key enemy positions like buildings and large blocks of units. The basic artillery units in the game are howitzers and guns such as the 105mm Schneider and the 80mm Gun. Vehicles include tanks such as the Whippet and the A7V that can be used to support infantry and trucks can quickly transport infantry. Anti-aircraft guns are effective against planes when used in large numbers. The most destructive units in the game are ships. These include destroyers such as the Russian Narvik, cruisers, battleships and merchant ships. Most of the ships in the game can produce considerable amounts of firepower.

The Entente includes several of the most famous aircraft of the era such as the SPAD XIII and Fokker D.I, reconnaissance planes such as the Etrich Taube and light and heavy bombers such the Maurice Farman S.11 and Sikorsky Ilya Muromets. An invention of the First World War, poison gas is a final weapon that can be used. The gas cloud will slowly kill any infantry enemy units in the gas cloud for a few minutes until it disappears.

Resources are collected in The Entente to fund the construction of units and buildings. The six resources in The Entente are food, wood, iron, gold, oil and electricity. The resources in the list can be gathered by workers working in farms, sawmills, iron mines, gold mines, oil rigs, and electric power stations.

Reception

References

2003 video games
Real-time strategy video games
Video games developed in Russia
Video games set in Europe
World War I video games
Lesta Studio games
Buka Entertainment games
Multiplayer and single-player video games
Encore Software games